WRKR (107.7 FM, "The Rocker") is a radio station broadcasting a classic rock format, consisting of classic album-oriented rock tracks from the late 1960s through the early 1990s. Licensed to Portage, Michigan, it first began broadcasting in 1988.

On August 30, 2013, a deal was announced in which Townsquare Media would acquire 53 stations from Cumulus Media, including WRKR, for $238 million. The deal is part of Cumulus' acquisition of Dial Global; Townsquare and Dial Global are both controlled by Oaktree Capital Management. The sale to Townsquare was completed on November 14, 2013.

References

Michiguide.com - WRKR History

External links

RKR
Classic rock radio stations in the United States
Radio stations established in 1988
Townsquare Media radio stations